Budalin  is a town in Budalin Township, Monywa District, Sagaing Division in Burma (Myanmar). It is the administrative seat of Budalin Township. The town is connected by road and rail to Monywa, Dabayin, Kin-U and Ye-U, with a bridge over the Mu River.

References

External links
Satellite map at Maplandia.com

Township capitals of Myanmar
Populated places in Sagaing Region